César Yadiel Ruíz (born January 18, 1995) is a Cuban sprinter. He competed at the 2016 Summer Olympics in the 4 × 100 metres relay, however he and his relay team did not progress from their heat.

References

External links 

1995 births
Living people
Cuban male sprinters
Athletes (track and field) at the 2016 Summer Olympics
Olympic athletes of Cuba
Central American and Caribbean Games gold medalists for Cuba
Competitors at the 2014 Central American and Caribbean Games
Central American and Caribbean Games medalists in athletics
21st-century Cuban people